Saujil (Tinogasta) is a village and municipality in Catamarca Province, in northwestern Argentina. Saujil translates as "illuminated place" in the indigenous Cacán language.

References

Populated places in Catamarca Province